HMS C19 was one of 38 C-class submarines built for the Royal Navy in the first decade of the 20th century. The boat survived the First World War and was sold for scrap in 1920.

Design and description
The C-class boats of the 1907–08 and subsequent Naval Programmes were modified to improve their speed, both above and below the surface. They displaced  on the surface and  submerged. The C-class submarines had a crew of two officers and fourteen ratings.

For surface running, the boats were powered by a single 12-cylinder  Vickers petrol engine that drove one propeller shaft. When submerged the propeller was driven by a  electric motor. They could reach  on the surface and  underwater.

The boats were armed with two 18-inch (45 cm) torpedo tubes in the bow. They could carry a pair of reload torpedoes, but generally did not as they would have to remove an equal weight of fuel in compensation.

Construction and career
C19 was laid down on 1 June 1908 by Vickers at their Barrow-in-Furness shipyard, launched on 20 March 1909, and completed on 9 November. During World War I, the boat was generally used for coastal defence and training in home waters. C19 was sold for scrap on 2 February 1920.

Notes

References
 
 
 
 

 

British C-class submarines
Royal Navy ship names
1909 ships